The 2020–21 season was Al-Fateh's 12th consecutive season in the Pro League and their 63rd year in existence. Al Fateh was a Saudi club. The club participated in the Pro League and the King Cup.

The season covered the period from 22 September 2020 to 30 June 2021.

Players

Squad information

Out on loan

Transfers and loans

Transfers in

Transfers out

Loans out

Pre-season

Competitions

Overview

Goalscorers

Last Updated: 30 May 2021

Assists

Last Updated: 30 May 2021

Clean sheets

Last Updated: 25 May 2021

References

Al-Fateh SC seasons
Fateh